Sétima Legião was a Portuguese rock band, active from 1982 when it was formed by friends Pedro Oliveira, Rodrigo Leão and Nuno Cruz until 2000. They named the band Sétima Legião after the Roman Seventh Legion sent to Lusitânia in the first century A.D.

In 1994, they split the stage with the British band The Stranglers to complete the opening act assignment in a live concert in Coimbra (Portugal) recorded in video on May 12.

Members
Pedro Oliveira (vocals and guitar)
Rodrigo Leão (bass and keys)
Nuno Cruz (drums, percussion)
Gabriel Gomes (accordion)
Paulo Tato Marinho (bagpipes, flute)
Ricardo Camacho (keys)
Paulo Abelho (percussion, samplers)
Francisco Ribeiro de Menezes (letters, backing vocals)

Discography

Studio albums
A Um Deus Desconhecido (1984)
Mar D'Outubro (1987)
De Um Tempo Ausente (1989)
O Fogo (1992)
Sexto Sentido (1999)

Live albums
Auto de Fé (1994)

Singles and promos
Glória/Partida (1983)
Sete Mares (1987)

Compilations
A História da Sétima Legião: Canções 1983-2000 (2000)
A História da Sétima Legião II: Músicas 1983-2003 (2003)
Sete Mares - Colecção Caravelas (2004)
Grandes Êxitos (2006)

References

External links
 Música Portuguesa - Anos 80 (Portuguese)
 (Portuguese)
 (Portuguese)
 (Portuguese)
 Apetece-me Música: Sétima Legião
 Sétima Legião on Myspace

Portuguese rock music groups
Musical groups established in 1982
1982 establishments in Portugal